Super Monsters Furever Friends is a 2018 American animation children's comedy television special starring Elyse Maloway, Vincent Tong and Erin Mathews set in the Super Monsters universe. With its length at 58 minutes, and the introduction of superpowered monster pets into the series, it is a significant expansion of the Super Monsters universe.

It was released on April 16, 2019 on Netflix streaming.

Premise
To celebrate the first day of spring, the Super Monsters and their parents has a picnic-party in the park. When the sun goes down, Cleo the mummy, Drac the vampire, Frankie the Frankenstein’s monster, Katya the witch, Lobo the werewolf, Zoe the zombie, and Spike the dragon boy, transform from human to monster form. They soon discover that they can forge a magical bond with animals.

Cast
 Elyse Maloway as Cleo / Mrs. Snow (voice)
 Vincent Tong as Drac / Luigi / Mr. Gabmore (voice)
 Erin Mathews as Frankie / Mrs. Mash / Sami / Griffy (voice)
 Andrea Libman as Katya (voice)
 Alessandro Juliani as Lobo / Mr. Howler (voice)
 Nicole Anthony as Zoe / Mrs. Carradine (voice)
 Diana Kaarina as Spike / Mrs. Gong (voice)
 Ian James Corlett as Igor (voice)
 Britt McKillip as Esmie (voice)
 Kathleen Barr as Glorb / Herri (voice)
 Nicole Oliver as Mrs. Graves (voice)
 Elishia Perosa as Ms. Spelling (voice)
 Nathan Witte as Dr. Walker (voice)
 Edward Foy as Count Dracula (voice)
 Maria J. Cruz as Abuelita (voice)

Release
It was released on April 16, 2019 on Netflix streaming.

References

External links
 
 
 

2010s American television specials
2010s animated television specials
2019 television specials
Animated television specials
Netflix children's programming